Glenn Rashad Moore (born March 16, 1979 in Huntsville, Alabama) is a former American football defensive tackle. He was originally drafted by the Seattle Seahawks in the sixth round of the 2003 NFL Draft. He played college football at Tennessee.

Moore has also been a member of the Oakland Raiders, New York Jets, New England Patriots, and the Atlanta Falcons in his career.

Early years
Moore attended Johnson High School in Huntsville, Alabama and was a student and a letterman in football and basketball. In football, as a senior, he posted 65 tackles, 10.5 sacks, and three fumble recoveries. In basketball, he was an All-Metropolitan selection and an All-Area selection.

College career
From 1998 through 2002 Moore attended the University of Tennessee. He played at defensive tackle the last four years (1999–2002) and totaled 95 tackles and 3.5 sacks. He majored in Psychology.

Professional career
In 2003 the Seattle Seahawks drafted Moore in the sixth round (183rd overall) of the 2003 NFL Draft. In his rookie season he played in 14 games and made 30 total tackles and one sack. The next season (2004), he played in all sixteen of the Seahawks' regular season games and made 46 total tackles and two sacks. After completing the team's 2005 training camp, Moore was released from the team. He did not play for any team in 2005. In 2006, he was signed by the New York Jets and he played in thirteen games, making 10 total tackles. On June 8, 2007 the New England Patriots signed Moore to a contract. He played with the team in all four of the 2007 preseason games before being released on September 1, 2007 in the team's final roster cutdown. On December 19, 2007 the Patriots re-signed him.

On March 7, 2008, he signed with the Atlanta Falcons.

References

External links
Atlanta Falcons bio
New England Patriots bio
New York Jets bio

1979 births
Living people
Sportspeople from Huntsville, Alabama
American football defensive tackles
Tennessee Volunteers football players
Seattle Seahawks players
Oakland Raiders players
New York Jets players
New England Patriots players
Atlanta Falcons players